MGX may refer to:
Magix company
Magnesium halide (MgX)
MGM Energy (MGX is TSX code)
Microsoft Global Exchange
Montenegro Airlines (its code)
Mysterious Girlfriend X manga
.MGX, the design division of Materialise NV